Bella Bella/Shearwater Water Aerodrome  is located adjacent to Shearwater, British Columbia, Canada.

See also
Bella Bella (Campbell Island) Airport
Denny Island Aerodrome
Bella Bella/Waglisla Water Aerodrome

References

Seaplane bases in British Columbia
Central Coast Regional District
Registered aerodromes in British Columbia